Our Aim Is to Satisfy is a 2000 studio album by the band Red Snapper. It is listed in the book 1001 Albums You Must Hear Before You Die.

Critical reception
The Guardian called Our Aim Is to Satisfy the band's best album to date, writing that they intersperse "moody, atmospheric instrumentals with funkier, soulful vocal tracks to make a collection that flows smoothly from beginning to end, a soundtrack for urban Britain that suggests a more revved-up Massive Attack."

Track listing

Personnel
Credits adapted from liner notes.
 David Ayers – guitar, keyboards
 Ali Friend – electric bass, double bass
 Richard Thair – drums, decks
 MC Det – vocals
 Karime Kendra – vocals
Jake Williams – keyboards
 Darren Morris – keyboards
 Mike Kearsy – trombone

Charts

References

External links
 

2000 albums
Red Snapper (band) albums
Matador Records albums
Warp (record label) albums